Phyllis Alesia Perry (born 1961, in Atlanta, Georgia) is a journalist and author. An African-American, she lives in the Southern United States.

Phyllis Alesia Perry is the daughter of Harmon Griggs Perry, the first African American reporter to be hired by the Atlanta Journal. She grew up in Tuskegee, Alabama and graduated with a degree in communications from the University of Alabama in 1982. Becoming a journalist, she was among a group of Alabama Journal reporters who won the Pulitzer Prize for investigating Alabama's high infant mortality rate.

Perry's debut novel, Stigmata (1998) follows the journey of a young woman, Lizzie, pursuing the story behind a handmade quilt she has inherited on the death of her grandmother. A Sunday in June (2003) is a prequel to Stigmata.

Works
Stigmata, 1998
A Sunday in June, 2004

References

1961 births
Living people
People from Tuskegee, Alabama
20th-century American novelists
21st-century American novelists
American women novelists
Novelists from Alabama
American women journalists
20th-century American women writers
21st-century American women writers
Journalists from Alabama
20th-century American journalists
21st-century American non-fiction writers
African-American novelists
20th-century African-American women
20th-century African-American people
21st-century African-American women writers
21st-century African-American writers